The 1965–66 Liga Bet season saw Hapoel Nahariya,  Hapoel Ra'anana, Hapoel Be'er Ya'akov and Beitar Be'er Sheva win their regional divisions and promoted to Liga Alef.

North Division A

North Division B

Maccabi Neve Shalom withdrew from the league.

South Division A

South Division B

References
Hapoel Nahariya, Ra'anana, Be'er Ya'akov and Beitar Be'er Sheva - to Liga Alef Davar, 30.5.66, Historical Jewish Press 
The next "unknown" - Beitar Be'er Sheva Maariv, 29.5.66, Historical Jewish Press 

Liga Bet seasons
Israel
3